The 1973 Virginia Slims of Richmond  was a women's tennis tournament played on indoor clay courts at the Westwood Racquet Club in Richmond, Virginia in the United States that was part of the 1973 Virginia Slims World Championship Series. It was the third edition of the tournament and was held from March 14 through March 18, 1973. First-seeded Margaret Court won the singles title and earned $6,000 first-prize money.

Finals

Singles
 Margaret Court defeated  Janet Newberry 6–2, 6–1

Doubles
 Margaret Court /  Lesley Hunt defeated  Karen Krantzcke /  Betty Stöve 6–2, 7–6(5–4)

Prize money

References

Virginia Slims of Richmond
1973 in sports in Virginia
Virginia Slims of Richmond
March 1973 sports events in the United States